Paraguay national under-20 football team represents Paraguay in international football competitions such as FIFA U-20 World Cup and South American Youth Football Championship.

The team's most successful period was mostly during 2001 to 2003 and once again in 2006, achieving Fourth place at the 2001 FIFA World Youth Championship before winning back-to-back tournaments at the Milk Cup in 2002 and 2003 and once again in 2006. Paraguay also won the 2002 SBS Cup disputed in Shizuoka Japan.

Overview
The under-20 Paraguay national football team has seen and delivered along the years many of Paraguay's best talents such as Juan Bautista Agüero, Julio César Romero, Roberto Cabañas, Paulo Da Silva, Justo Villar, Salvador Cabañas and Roque Santa Cruz.

The team has participated in 8 events of the FIFA World Youth Championship and the best performance came in the 2001 World Cup held in Argentina, when Paraguay finished in the fourth place. The best performance at the South American level came in 1971 when they won the South American Youth Football Championship (also known as "Juventud de América"), along with four runners-up finishes in 1964, 1967, 1985 and 2009.

Paraguay has qualified for 2009 FIFA U-20 World Cup that was held in Egypt.

Current talents for the Paraguay squad include Hernán Pérez, Robin Ramírez, Nicolás Martínez, Federico Santander and Joel Silva.

Tournament records

FIFA U-20 World Cup

{|class="wikitable" style="text-align: center;"
!colspan=9|FIFA U-20 World Cup
|-
!Hosts / Year
!Result
!width=20|
!width=20|
!width=20|
!width=20|
!width=20|
!width=20|
|-
| 1977||Group stage||3||2||0||1||6||2
|-
| 1979||Quarter-finals||4||2||1||1||8||3 
|-
| 1981
|rowspan=2 colspan=7|Did not qualify
|-
| 1983
|-
| 1985||Group stage||3||0||1||2||3||6
|-
| 1987
|rowspan=5 colspan=7|Did not qualify
|-
| 1989
|-
| 1991
|-
| 1993
|-
| 1995
|-
| 1997||Group stage||3||0||2||1||5||6
|-
| 1999||Round of 16||4||2||1||1||7||8
|-
|- style="background:#9acdff;"
| 2001||Fourth place||7||3||1||3||8||11
|-
| 2003||Round of 16||4||2||0||2||4||4
|-
| 2005
|rowspan=2 colspan=7|Did not qualify
|-
| 2007
|-
| 2009||Round of 16||4||1||2||1||2||4
|-
| 2011
|colspan=7|Did not qualify
|-
| 2013||Round of 16||4||1||2||1||3||3
|-
| 2015
|rowspan=4 colspan=7|Did not qualify
|-
| 2017
|-
| 2019
|-
| 2023
|-
|Total||9/23||36||13||10||13||46||47|-
|}

Current squad
 The following players were called up for the Football at the 2022 South American Games.
 Match dates: 1–14 October 2022
 Opposition: ,  and 
Caps and goals correct as of: 25 September 2022, after the match against

See also
Paraguay national football team
Paraguay national under-23 football team
Paraguay national under-17 football team
 Paraguay women's national under-20 football team
Football in Paraguay

References

External links
APF Website

under-20
South American national under-20 association football teams